Percy MacKaye (1875–1956) was an American dramatist and poet.

Biography
MacKaye was born in New York City into a theatrical family. His father, Steele MacKaye, was a popular actor, playwright, and producer, while his mother, Mary, wrote a dramatization of Pride and Prejudice, first produced in 1910. His brother James MacKaye was a philosopher, while brother Benton MacKaye was a forester and conservationist. His sister, Hazel MacKaye, became a women's suffrage leader and pageant director.

After graduating from Harvard in 1897, he traveled in Europe for three years, residing in Rome, Switzerland and London, studying at the University of Leipzig in 1899–1900. He returned to New York City to teach at a private school until 1904, when he joined a colony of artists and writers in Cornish, New Hampshire, and devoted himself entirely to dramatic work.

He wrote the plays The Canterbury Pilgrims in 1903, Sappho and Phaon in 1907, Jeanne D'Arc in 1907, The Scarecrow in 1908, Anti-Matrimony in 1910, and the poetry collection The Far Familiar in 1937. In 1950, MacKaye published The Mystery of Hamlet King of Denmark, or What We Will, a series of four plays written as prequels to William Shakespeare's Hamlet. His sister Hazel acted in or helped produce several of his early works.

He was made a member of the National Institute of Arts and Letters in 1914. In the 1920s, MacKaye was poet in residence at Miami University in Oxford, Ohio. He lectured on the theatre at Harvard, Yale, Columbia and other universities in the United States.

Percy MacKaye is considered to be the first poet of the Atomic Era because of his sonnet "The Atomic Law," which was published in the Christmas 1945 issue of The Churchman.

Civic Theatre
In 1912, he published The Civic Theatre in Relation to the Redemption of Leisure; A Book of Suggestions. Here he presented a concept of Civic Theatre as "the conscious awakening of the people to self-government in its leisure". To this end he called for the active involvement of the public, not merely as spectators, professional staff not dominated by commercial considerations and the elimination of private profit by endowment and public support. This idea is most apparent in his play Caliban by the Yellow Sands (1916). This concept was influential on Platon Kerzhentsev and the Soviet Proletcult Theatre movement.

Works

Poetry

Plays
 Beowulf: A Drama of Anglo-Saxon Legend, c. 1899 (unpublished; posthumously performed at Texas A&M University on September 22, 2016)
The Canterbury Pilgrims, 1903.  This comedy was produced by the Coburn Players in the open air at Harvard, Yale and other universities in 1909–13, and given as a civic pageant in honor of President Taft at Gloucester, Massachusetts, 4 August 1909.
 Fenris the Wolf, 1905
  Produced by E. H. Sothern and Julia Marlowe in the United States and England.
 
 
 
  Produced and acted by Henrietta Crosman.
 
 
 
  Produced for President Wilson at Meriden Bird Club Sanctuary, New Hampshire.
 
  A community masque to commemorate the Shakespeare Tercentenary.
 
 
 The Pilgrim and the Book. 1920. A dramatic “Service” for celebrating the Pilgrim Centenary.

Opera

Non-fiction

References

External links

Percy MacKaye papers, 1879-1956. Houghton Library, Harvard University.
The Papers of the MacKaye Family at Dartmouth College Library
 
 
 
Portrait by Wayne Turney at 20m.com
Article in Time Magazine of 4 February 1924 at time.com
 Percy MacKaye Letters from Wilson Family at Dartmouth College Library

1875 births
1956 deaths
20th-century American poets
Miami University faculty
Leipzig University alumni
Harvard University alumni
Writers from New York City
American opera librettists
20th-century American dramatists and playwrights
American male poets
American male dramatists and playwrights
20th-century American male writers